The Stonehill Skyhawks men's ice hockey team represents Stonehill College in NCAA Division I ice hockey. On April 5, 2022, the school announced that they were promoting all of their varsity programs to Division I for the 2022–23 academic year.

History
Stonehill began playing varsity hockey in 1978 joining ECAC 3, the lowest level of college hockey at the time. They remained with the conference through its various rebrandings and member changes for over 30 years. During that time the team was not successful, posting just 4 winning seasons in its first 22 campaigns and never making a single postseason appearance.

The program's fortunes began to change in 2000 when former NHL player Scott Harlow was hired to coach the team. During his seven-year tenure, the club recorded three winning seasons, its first postseason victories, and captured its first conference championship. While Harlow was in charge, the program was also going through a transitional phase. After the Division II level of college hockey collapsed in 1984, there was no place for nominally D-II programs to play. When the NCAA began offering automatic bids to the Division III Tournament in 1999, it came with a caveat; programs could not participate in postseason play if their school participated at a higher level. Because Stonehill was a D-II school, they were frozen out of the reformatted ECAC Northeast tournament. However, since they were not alone in their plight, Stonehill banded together with four other programs and began holding a separate D-II tournament at the end of the season. This arrangement continued until 2009 when all of the active Division II programs founded the ice hockey division of the Northeast-10.

Stonehill fell on hard times after Harlow left in 2007. Six years later, upon the arrival of David Borges, the team suddenly shot up the standings and won three consecutive regular season titles. While the Skyhawks weren't able to sustain that pace forever, Borges help steer the program though the lost 2021 season and was behind the bench when the school announced that they were promoting all of their varsity programs to D-I in April 2022.

Season-by-season results

Coaches
As of the completion of 2021–22 season

Statistical leaders

Career points leaders

Career goaltending leaders

GP = Games played; Min = Minutes played; W = Wins; L = Losses; T = Ties; GA = Goals against; SO = Shutouts; SV% = Save percentage; GAA = Goals against average

Minimum 30 games

Statistics current through the start of the 2022–23 season.

Roster
As of September 12, 2022.

|}

See also
Stonehill Skyhawks

References

External links

 
Ice hockey teams in Massachusetts